Aco Best: Girl's Diary is a compilation album by Japanese singer-songwriter Aco, containing released singles from all her seven albums. It was released on 19 December 2007. It consists of two discs.

Track listing

Disc 1
 
 
 Home Sweet Home
 Drop
 
 
 
 
 
 
 Lady Soul (Day-lite Version)

Disc 2
 
 
 
 Spleen (Sunahaea's Studio Remix)
 
 Guilty
 
 
 
 
 
 Hans
 Ya-yo!

References 

Aco (musician) albums
2007 greatest hits albums